Nemetschek Group is a vendor of software for architects, engineers and the construction industry. The company develops and distributes software for planning, designing, building and managing buildings and real estate, as well as for media and entertainment.

History

20th century
The company was founded by Prof. Georg Nemetschek in 1963 and initially went by the name of Ingenieurbüro für das Bauwesen (engineering firm for the construction industry), focusing on structural design. It was one of the first companies in the industry to use computers and developed software for engineers, initially for its own requirements. In 1977 Nemetschek started distributing its program Statik 97/77 for civil engineering.

At the Hanover Fair in 1980, Nemetschek presented a software package for integrated calculation and design of standard components for solid construction. This was the first software enabling Computer-aided engineering (CAE) on microcomputers, and the product remained unique on the market for many years.
 

In 1989, Nemetschek Programmsystem GmbH was founded and was responsible for software distribution; Georg Nemetschek's engineering firm continued to be in charge of program development. The main product, Allplan – a CAD system for architects and engineers, was launched in 1984. This allowed designers to model buildings in three dimensions. Nemetschek began to expand internationally in the 1980s. By 1996 the company had subsidiaries in eight European countries and distribution partners in nine European countries; since 1992 it has also had a development site in Bratislava, Slovakia.

The first acquisitions were made at the end of the 1990s, including the structural design program vendor Friedrich + Lochner. The company, operating as Nemetschek AG since 1994, went public in 1999 (it has been listed in the Prime Standard market segment and the TecDAX in Frankfurt ever since).

21st century
Two major company takeovers followed in 2000: the American firm Diehl Graphsoft (now Vectorworks) and Maxon Computer GmbH, with its Cinema 4D software for visualization and animation. In 2006 Nemetschek acquired Hungary's Graphisoft (for its key product ArchiCAD), and Belgium's SCIA International.

In November 2013 Nemetschek acquired the MEP software provider Data Design System (DDS). On 31 October 2014 the acquisition of Bluebeam Software, Inc. was concluded. At the end of 2015 Solibri was acquired.

Since 2016, the company has operated as Nemetschek SE. Later that year, SDS/2 was acquired. In 2017, it acquired dRofus and RISA. MCS Solutions was acquired in 2018, closely followed by the acquisition of Axxerion B.V and Plandatis and subsequently rebranded to Spacewell. Other acquisitions have been completed at a brand level (for example, Redshift Rendering Technologies, Red Giant and Pixologic were acquired by Maxon, DEXMA by Spacewell).

Since 18 September 2018, Nemetschek is listed in the MDAX in addition to its TecDAX listing.

Among others, Nemetschek is a member of the BuildingSMART e.V. and the Deutsche Gesellschaft für Nachhaltiges Bauen (DGNB) (German Sustainable Building Council), actively advocating for open building information modeling (BIM) standards ("open BIM") in the AEC/O industry.

Business units 
Since 2008, Nemetschek has acted as a holding company with four business units:

 Planning & Design (Architecture and Civil Engineering)
 Build & Construct
 Manage & Operate
 Media & Entertainment.

The holding company maintains 13 product brands, covering the whole building lifecycle, from planning to operations.

See also 
 Comparison of CAD editors for architecture, engineering and construction (AEC)

References

External links 
Nemetschek SE website

Companies based in Munich
Software companies established in 1963
Software companies of Germany
Companies listed on the Frankfurt Stock Exchange
Building information modeling
German brands
Companies in the TecDAX
Companies in the MDAX
1963 establishments in West Germany